Anamika is a 2022 Hindi-language streaming television series directed by Vikram Bhatt and written by Shweta Bothra. It stars Sunny Leone, Rahul Dev, Sonnalli Seygall, Samir Soni, Shehzad Shaikh, Ayaz Khan, Romil K. Sharma. The series is also available in Tamil, Telugu, Malayalam, Kannada, Marathi and Bengali languages in dubbed version. The series is OTT debut of Sunny Leone in her acting career.

Cast 
 Sunny Leone as Anamika
 Rahul Dev as Ravi Shrivastav
 Ayaz Khan as Dr. Prashant
 Sonnalli Seygall as Rhea
 Samir Soni as Sameer Oberoi
 Susheel Parashar as Raghunath Chouhan
 Libert Olivera as Police chief
 Rajesh Desai as Hafiz
 Garrvil Mohan as Ansari
 Manish Kapoor as Hotel manager
 Abhishek Sharma as Khurana
 Randheer Rai as Walia
 Puneet Tejwani as Desai
 Gourav Singh as Kappor
 Shehzad Shaikh as Rohan
 Romil K. Sharma as Pradeep

Plot 
Anamika (Sunny Leone), who lost her memories in a dramatic situation, continues her fights and revenges without knowing her past that she was a spy cop.

Release 
The official trailer of Anamika was released on 1 March, 2022. The web series was released on MX Player on 10 March 2022.

Reception 
Archika Khurana of The Times of India rated 3 out of 5 stars and wrote "Sunny Leone in and as Anamika engages the viewers in the thrilling encounters with the mafia and DTA Agents who are after her. One can really sit back and enjoy the action. Her training in a variety of combat (a combination of martial arts forms) is evident, especially in her movements and body language." 

Udita Jhunjhunwala for Firstpost wrote "The supporting actors range from caricatures (Ansari, an expletive spewing drug dealer dressed in all-white) to deadpan (Shrivastav) to slightly camp (Sameer Soni as businessman Sameer Oberoi)." 

Priyakshi Sharma of Pinkvilla wrote "It should be definitely noted that Sunny Leone is cast in a never-seen-before action avatar. She’s knocking down men with guns with ferocity. In Anamika, she is not reduced to being an object of the male gaze, but she’s someone with a complex history, a troubled past, and a conflict with her own mind, and that’s a great start to break free of being typecast." 

Reviewing the web series Binged wrote "The climax, like most of the story before offers twists. They don’t have an impact, and some we can see them coming miles away."

Reference

External links 
 

2022 Indian television seasons